Șieu is a commune in Bistrița-Năsăud County, Transylvania, Romania. It is composed of four villages: Ardan (Garendorf; Árdány), Posmuș (Paßbusch; Paszmos), Șieu and Șoimuș (Almesch; Sajósolymos).

References

Communes in Bistrița-Năsăud County
Localities in Transylvania